This article refers to crime in the U.S. state of Pennsylvania.

State statistics
In 2008 there were 351,353 crimes reported in Pennsylvania, including 707 murders. In 2014 there were 287,180 crimes reported, including 614 murders.

Policing 

In 2008, Pennsylvania had 1,117 State and local law enforcement agencies. Those agencies employed a total of 33,670 staff. Of the total staff, 27,413 were sworn officers (defined as those with general arrest powers).

Police ratio 

In 2008, Pennsylvania had 218 police officers per 100,000 residents.

Capital punishment laws

Capital punishment is applied in Pennsylvania.

See also
 Law of Pennsylvania
 Philadelphia crime family
 Bufalino crime family
 Pittsburgh crime family

References